U.S. Route 84 (US 84) is a U.S. highway that runs from Pagosa Springs, CO to Midway, GA. In Texas, the highway enters the state from New Mexico at Farwell, near the Panhandle region. Major cities along the highway include Lubbock, Abilene, Waco and Palestine. The highway exits Texas into Louisiana near Joaquin, crossing the Toledo Bend Reservoir.

Route description
US 84 enters into Texas at Farwell, concurrent with US 70 from New Mexico. The US 70 overlap ends in Muleshoe. US 84 bypasses the towns of Littlefield and Shallowater before entering Lubbock. The highway just passes north of the Texas Tech University campus and enters downtown as Avenue Q. As Avenue Q, the highway parallels I-27 before crossing it, just north of that highway's southern terminus. Leaving the city, US 84 serves the towns of Post and Snyder before reaching Roscoe, where it begins its overlap with I-20.

The two highways run through Sweetwater before reaching Abilene. US 84 leaves the interstate on the western side of the city, running with I-20's business loop. US 84 joins US 83/US 277, with US 277 leaving the concurrency after a short distance. US 84 leaves US 83, northeast of Tuscola. US 84 runs southeast to Coleman, overlapping with US 283 in the process and joining US 67. After leaving Brownwood, US 84 leaves US 67 and joins US 183. US 84 becomes a solo route again in Goldthwaite, traveling through Gatesville. In Gatesville, the hwy meets SH 36, which coincidentally also runs to Abilene, albeit in a more direct way than US 84.

East of McGregor, US 84 becomes a 4-lane divided highway before becoming a freeway in Woodway. At SH 6, US 84 becomes a surface street, running through Waco. The highway enters Bellmead before leaving the Waco area. Several miles to the east, the highway enters Palestine. US 84 runs through several smaller communities before crossing over the Toledo Bend Reservoir, into Louisiana, running towards Mansfield.

US 84 is part of the El Camino East/West Corridor, which spans five states starting in Texas.

Future
Studies are underway to build a completely new route of US 84 around the city of Lubbock, in an attempt to relieve traffic going into the city. This bypass, tentatively named Loop 88, is to start construction in 2020.

In Abilene, Winters Freeway from Canyon Rock Road to FM 707 is beginning upgrades. This includes converting two-way frontage roads to one-way, adding u-turns, removing the crossover of Iberis Road and building a crossover near Lytle Creek.

An upgrade is in progress along US 84 from Ritchie Road to Harris Creek Road; this includes implementing a divide-interchange with Speegleville Road in south Waco.

US 84 in Tenaha between the US 59/US 96/Future I-69/Future I-369 interchange and just about 2 miles east of the interchange will become I-69. This would allow for heavy traffic on I-69 not have to slow down throughout Tenaha. This segment is expected to start work in 2016. The interchange with US 59/US 96 currently is being upgraded to Interstate standards. US 96's northern terminus will remain, and this is expected to be the southern terminus of I-369. I-369 has been proposed to be routed south of this interchange to the coastline. This would make I-369 the longest auxiliary route in the US, surpassing Interstate 476.

Major intersections

References

84
 Texas
Texas
Transportation in Parmer County, Texas
Transportation in Bailey County, Texas
Transportation in Lamb County, Texas
Transportation in Hockley County, Texas
Transportation in Lubbock, Texas
Transportation in Lubbock County, Texas
Transportation in Lynn County, Texas
Transportation in Garza County, Texas
Transportation in Scurry County, Texas
Transportation in Mitchell County, Texas
Transportation in Nolan County, Texas
Transportation in Taylor County, Texas
Transportation in Coleman County, Texas
Transportation in Brown County, Texas
Transportation in Mills County, Texas
Transportation in Hamilton County, Texas
Transportation in Coryell County, Texas
Transportation in McLennan County, Texas
Transportation in Limestone County, Texas
Transportation in Freestone County, Texas
Transportation in Anderson County, Texas
Transportation in Cherokee County, Texas
Transportation in Rusk County, Texas
Transportation in Shelby County, Texas
Freeways in Texas